GRN may refer to:

Broadcasting 
 Global Radio News, a journalism organization
 Government Radio Network (Australia)
 Guadalupe Radio Network
 Swedish Broadcasting Commission

Transport 
 Greensborough railway station, in Victoria, Australia
 Greenville and Northern Railway, a defunct American railroad
 Grindleford railway station, in England

Other uses 
 Gene regulatory network
 Global Recordings Network, US Christian network
 Granulin
 Grenada, IOC and UNDP country code
 Guarani dialects, ISO-639 code